The wet-bulb globe temperature (WBGT) is a type of apparent temperature used to estimate the effect of temperature, humidity, wind speed (wind chill), and visible and infrared radiation (usually sunlight) on humans. It is used by industrial hygienists, athletes, sporting events and the military to determine appropriate exposure levels to high temperatures.  It is derived from the following formula:

where 
 Tw = Natural wet-bulb temperature (combined with dry-bulb temperature indicates humidity)
 Tg = Globe thermometer temperature (measured with a globe thermometer, also known as a black globe thermometer)
 Td = Dry-bulb temperature (actual air temperature)
 Temperatures may be in either Celsius or Fahrenheit

Indoors, or when solar radiation is negligible, the following formula is often used:

Uses
The American Conference of Governmental Industrial Hygienists publishes threshold limit values (TLVs) that have been adopted by many governments for use in the workplace. The process for determining the WBGT is also described in ISO 7243, Hot Environments - Estimation of the Heat Stress on Working Man, Based on the WBGT Index. The American College of Sports Medicine bases its guidelines on the intensity of sport practices based on WBGT.

In hot areas, some US military installations display a flag to indicate the heat category based on the WBGT. The military publishes guidelines for water intake and physical activity level for acclimated and unacclimated individuals in different uniforms based on the heat category. The University of Georgia adapted these categories for use in college sports as a guideline for how strenuous practices can be.

{| class="wikitable"
!Category||WBGT (°F)||WBGT (°C)||Flag color
|-
|1||≤ 78–81.9||≤ 25.6–27.7||style="background:white;color:black"|White
|-
|2||82–84.9||27.8–29.4||style="background:limegreen;color:black"|Green
|-
|3||85–87.9||29.5–31.0||style="background:yellow;color:black"|Yellow
|-
|4||88–89.9||31.1–32.1||style="background:red;color:white"|Red
|-
|5||≥ 90||≥ 32.2||style="background:black;color:white"|Black
|}

Related temperature comfort measures
The heat index used by the U.S. National Weather Service and the humidex used by the Meteorological Service of Canada, along with the wind chill used in both countries, are also measures of perceived heat or cold, but they do not account for the effects of radiation.

The "RealFeel" temperature is a measure offered by AccuWeather, a commercial weather forecasting company, to purportedly combine temperature and humidity plus radiation (presumably by approximation, since American weather observation systems do not measure solar radiation directly); the RealFeel formula is a proprietary trade secret.

See also
Hygrometer

References

Further reading
 Air Force Pamphlet 48-151
 U.S. Army Technical Bulletin Medical 507/Air Force Pamphlet 48-152
 Zunis Foundation background article

External links 
 Thermal Comfort observations from the Australian Bureau of Meteorology
 Extreme Hot or Cold Temperature Conditions from the Canadian Centre for Occupational Health and Safety
 OSHA Technical Manual: Heat Stress from the U.S. Occupational Safety and Health Administration
 Knowledge Portal WBGT

Occupational safety and health
Atmospheric thermodynamics
Temperature
Meteorological indices